Miller Brothers may refer to:
 Clell Miller and Edward T. Miller (outlaw), outlaws connected to the James-Younger Gang
 Rand Miller, Ryan Miller and Robyn Miller, co-founders of the company Cyan Worlds, which developed the computer game Myst

See also
Miller Brothers 101 Ranch, a National Historic Landmark in Oklahoma
Miller Brothers Farm, a house in the US state of Georgia on the National Register of Historic Places